Little Girl Lost is an American drama television film directed by Sharron Miller from a teleplay by Ann Beckett, based on a story by Angela Shelley and C. Scott Alsop. The film stars Tess Harper, Frederic Forrest, and Patricia Kalember, with Lawrence Pressman, Christopher McDonald, Sandy Martin, Joel Colodner, William Edward Phipps, and Marie Martin in supporting roles. It premiered on ABC on April 25, 1988, and earned a Primetime Emmy Award nomination for its cinematography.

Plot
The film tells the true story of a six-year-old girl named Tella who is removed from the loving care of her foster parents the Bradys and returned to her biological father, who sexually assaults her. Her foster parents endure a long struggle to regain custody of their beloved lost child.

Cast

Frederic Forrest as Tim Brady
Tess Harper as Clara Brady
Kathy Tragester as Kelly Brady
Marie Martin as Tella Brady
Christopher McDonald as Wolff
Sandy Martin as Violet Young 
Matthew Scott Carlton as Nathan Lees
C. Jack Robinson as Judge Greer
Gigi Cervantes as Brandy
Rudy Young as Ed De Busk
Annabelle Weenick as Gwynneth Soames
Esther Benson as Mrs. Morella
Suzanne Savoy as Dr. Deborah Meewsen
Gil Glasgow as Police Officer
Lee Ritchey as Earl Lockwood
Libby Villari as Harriet Baker
Deborah Winters as File Clerk
Vernon Grote as Bailiff
Hugh Feagin as Bruce Magnusen
Lawrence Pressman as Lester

Awards and nominations

References

External links
 

1988 films
1988 drama films
1988 television films
1980s American films
1980s English-language films
ABC network original films
American drama television films
American films based on actual events
Drama films based on actual events
Television films based on actual events
Films about adoption
Films about child abuse
Films about father–daughter relationships
Films about mother–daughter relationships
Films directed by Sharron Miller
Films scored by Billy Goldenberg
Films shot in Dallas
Films shot in Texas